The Government Railway Police (IAST: Sarkārī Relve Pulis), abbreviated as GRP, is the force responsible for policing railway stations and trains of Indian Railways. Its duties correspond to those of the District Police in the areas under their jurisdiction, such as patrolling, but only on railway property. While Railway Protection Force (RPF) comes under Ministry of Railways, Government of India, GRP comes under the respective state or union territory police. The GRP's responsibility is to observe law and order on all railway property, while RPF is mainly responsible for protecting and securing all railway property. Currently, even if a crime is detected by the RPF, the case has to be handed over to the GRP for further enquiry.

Role
The primary role of the GRP is to observe law & order within railway stations in India. They provide security and perform investigation of offences in trains and railway premises.  GRP also renders any assistance required to railway officers and the Railway Protection Force. Specific duties including control of passenger and commuter traffic, thus preventing overcrowding, controlling vehicle traffic within station premises, arresting criminals, and removing persons with disease and preventing hawking and begging. It also examines empty train carriages at the time of arrival at their termini for lost property left behind by passengers or stolen from trains and sees to the removal of bodies of persons who die on trains or near station premises and their medical needs.

History 

The Mumbai Railway District was established in the year 1938 under the name of Central South Western Railway (CSW Railway). Mumbai Railway Police Commissionerate covers the entire Railway Network starting from Gujarat border on Western Railways to Mumbai and from CSMT to Kasara and Khopoli stations on the Central Railway Network and from CSMT to Roha on the Harbour Railway Network.

Meanwhile, on 1 November 1956, after the Central South Western Railway division, Nagpur Railway District came into existence and Shri. R.R. Harnagade (IPS) was appointed as the Superintendent of Police of this district. Then in the year 1960, Mumbai, Gujarat and Karnataka were divided and Maharashtra was formed. Subsequently, on 1 May 1981, the Central South Western Railway District was re-divided and two districts, Mumbai Railway and Pune Railway, came into existence. At that time, the first Superintendent of Police of Mumbai Railway District was Mr Vishwas Kale (IPS) and the first Superintendent of Police of Pune Railway District was Mr Brijkishore (IPS) At that time, both Mumbai Railway and Pune Railway districts were under the jurisdiction of the Dy. Inspector-General of Police, State Investigation Department. On 2 October 1980, the post was reflected in the post of Inspector General of Police, Railway Range, Maharashtra State, Mumbai and Mr J.F. Ribero (IPS) was appointed to the post. Subsequently, on 30/04/1997, the rank of the post was increased to the rank of Special Inspector General of Police and Shri. D.N. Jadhav (IPS) was appointed to the post. The post of Special Inspector General of Police was held from 30 April 1997 to 20 April 2001. Thereafter from 20 April 2001 to 2 October 2003 the rank of the post was again increased to the rank of Additional Director General of Police. Subsequently, from 9 October 2003 to 21 June 2007, the post of Additional Director General of Police was reduced to Special Inspector General of Police. Subsequently, on 5 July 2007, the rank of the post was again increased to the rank of Additional Director General of Police and Shri. K.P. Raghuvanshi (IPS) was appointed on it. Nagpur, Pune and Mumbai were the three Railway police districts under the jurisdiction of the Additional Director General of Police, Railway, State of Maharashtra, Mumbai. On 2 October 1999, the Mumbai Railway District was transformed into a Commissionerate. Mr T.S. Bhal (IPS) was the Superintendent of Police when the Mumbai Railway District was converted into a Commissionerate. After the conversion into the Commissionerate, the first commissioner of the GRP in Mumbai, Mr S.M. Mushrif (IPS) with the rank of Special Inspector General of Police, was appointed. On 16 August 2018, Nagpur Railway district was divided and Aurangabad Railway district was formed and Mr Chandrakishore Mina (IPS) was appointed as the first Superintendent of Police of the district.

, the GRP in Mumbai falls under the Maharashta Ministry of Home Affairs, headed by Dilip Walse-Patil. Quaiser Khalid, IPS is Police Commissioner of the GRP in Mumbai, under the Maharashtra Police. There are 17 Railway Police Stations.

See also
 Railways Act 1989

References

Ministry of Railways (India)
Federal law enforcement agencies of India
Railroad police agencies
Specialist law enforcement agencies of India
Indian Railways
1881 establishments in British India
Government agencies established in 1881